Asadkhan (also Romanized as Āsadkhān) is a village in Qara Bashlu Rural District, Chapeshlu District, Dargaz County, Razavi Khorasan Province, Iran. At the 2006 census, its population was 125, in 23 families.

See also 

 List of cities, towns and villages in Razavi Khorasan Province

References 

Populated places in Dargaz County